Asta Põldmäe (born in 1944 in Puurmani, Tartu County) is an Estonian writer and translator.

She graduated from Tartu State University in journalism.

Since 1986 she is literary editor for the magazine Looming.

Since 1978 she has been a member of Estonian Writers' Union.

Awards
1979: Juhan Smuul Annual Literary Prize in the field of children's and youth literature 
1983: Friedebert Tuglas Short Story Award
1995: Friedebert Tuglas Short Story Award
2021: Order of the White Star, Class V

Works

 Me (Loomingu Raamatukogu, 1977, nr 1)
 Mitmekesi maateral (Eesti Raamat, Tallinn 1978)
 Linnadealune muld (Eesti Raamat, 1989)
 Sügisjooniku seeme (Eesti Raamat, 1989)
 Viini plika (Ilmamaa, Tartu 1999)
 Kirjad pääsukestele. Epistolaareleegia (Eesti Keele Sihtasutus, Tallinn 2009)
 Ja valguse armulise : kirjatöid aastaist 1975–2013 (Eesti Keele Sihtasutus, Tallinn, 2014)

References

1944 births
Living people
Estonian women short story writers
Estonian women poets
Estonian children's writers
20th-century Estonian women writers
21st-century Estonian women writers
Estonian translators
Estonian editors
Estonian magazine editors
Estonian women editors
University of Tartu alumni
People from Põltsamaa Parish